Petra Nardelli (born 10 April 1996) is an Italian sprinter, selected to be part of the Italian athletics team for the Tokyo 2020 Olympics, as a possible member of the relay team.

References

External links
 

1996 births
Living people
Italian female sprinters
Sportspeople from Bolzano
Athletes (track and field) at the 2020 Summer Olympics
Olympic athletes of Italy
20th-century Italian women
21st-century Italian women